The Integrated Head Protection System (IHPS) is the United States Army's newest combat helmet, intended to eventually replace the Advanced Combat Helmet and Enhanced Combat Helmet.

It was developed by the US Army Soldier Protection System (SPS) program, and is produced by Avon Protection Ceradyne, a subsidiary of Avon Protection.

The helmet was first issued in 2019 to troops deploying to combat zones like Afghanistan, Iraq, and Syria.

History 

The IHPS helmet began development as a replacement for the Advanced Combat Helmets and Enhanced Combat Helmets in 2013 under the U.S. Army's Soldier Protection System program, which is intended to improve soldier protection and performance while reducing weight of a soldiers Personal Protective Equipment. Low Rate Initial Production delivery began 2nd quarter of the 2018 fiscal year. The helmet was first issued to troops deploying to combat zones through the Rapid Fielding Initiative (RFI) program.

In October 2019 the new helmet was reported to have saved a soldier’s life in Afghanistan, protecting his head from a brick thrown at his vehicle.

The IHPS was deployed with U.S. Army's 25th Infantry Division soldiers during the 2019–20 attack on the U.S. embassy in Baghdad.

Design 
The IHPS, combined with Military Combat Eye Protection (MCEP), completes the head protection portion of the Soldier Protection System. The IHPS is claimed to be 5% lighter than previous helmets, while offering improved blunt force impact, passive hearing and ballistic protection. An optional 2 lb/.9 kg applique armor plate is available for further improved ballistic protection.

The IHPS uses a boltless chinstrap retention system, unlike previous helmets that needed pre drilled holes for bolts that fastened the chinstrap to the helmet, which created ballistic weakpoints. The IHPS has an optional mandible with eye shield for maxillofacial protection, and side rails for attaching equipment like flashlights, cameras and helmet mounted headsets. Both the legacy PVS-14 and PSQ-20 night vision devices can be mounted, as well as the new ENVG-B. In late 2021, Avon Protection Ceradyne announced the completed development of a proprietary rail-mounted adapter for 3M-produced Peltor ComTac headsets, likely in response to the common complaint among troops that the helmet previously lacked the communications integration capabilities that are quickly becoming the norm with the rising popularity of high-cut style helmets.

References

Combat helmets of the United States
Military equipment introduced in the 2010s